Rahahan Metro Station is a metro station in line3 of Tehran metro, located in Rahahan Square. As suggested by the name, it is connected with Tehran Railway Station (Istgah-e Rah Ahan-e Tehran)

References

 Tehran Metro station introduction

External links
 

 
Tehran Metro stations

See also
List of Tehran Metro stations